Pemphredon lugubris is a Palearctic species of solitary wasp.

References

External links
Images representing Pemphredon lugubris

Hymenoptera of Europe
Crabronidae
Insects described in 1793